Carabus bremii is a species of ground beetle in the family Carabidae. It is found in Italy.

References

Carabus